Events in the year 1917 in Bulgaria.

Incumbents

Events 

 The Battle of Doiran was fought between the United Kingdom and Bulgaria during World War I.

References 

 
1910s in Bulgaria
Years of the 20th century in Bulgaria
Bulgaria
Bulgaria